Andrew Uwe (born 10 August 1963) is a Nigerian former footballer. He competed in the men's tournament at the 1988 Summer Olympics.

References

External links
 
 

1963 births
Living people
Nigerian footballers
Nigeria international footballers
Olympic footballers of Nigeria
Footballers at the 1988 Summer Olympics
Place of birth missing (living people)
Association football defenders
Leventis United F.C. players
Heartland F.C. players
K.S.V. Roeselare players
SV Wehen Wiesbaden players
VfB Oldenburg players
Rot Weiss Ahlen players
BV Cloppenburg players
Nigerian expatriate footballers
Expatriate footballers in Belgium
Expatriate footballers in Germany